Special Assignment is a Canadian current affairs television series which aired on CBC Television in 1976.

Premise
This series featured news analysis from CBC News reporters and was recorded at CBC facilities in different cities.

Scheduling
This five-minute series was broadcast weekdays at 11:22 p.m. (Eastern time) from 5 January to 25 June 1976, following The National.

References

External links
 

CBC Television original programming
1976 Canadian television series debuts
1976 Canadian television series endings
1970s Canadian television news shows
Television news program articles using incorrect naming style